The Big Timer is a  1932 American Pre-Code sports drama film directed by Edward Buzzell and starring Ben Lyon, Constance Cummings and Thelma Todd. Produced and distributed by Columbia Pictures, it is about a boxer whose success goes to his head.

Plot
Cooky Bradford wants to make enough money to buy a lunch wagon. He ends up falling for, and fighting for, boxing manager Pop Baldwin's daughter, Honey.

Cast
Ben Lyon as Cooky Bradford
Constance Cummings as Honey Baldwin
Thelma Todd as Kay Mitchell
Tom Dugan as Catfish
Robert Emmett O'Connor as Dan Wilson
Charley Grapewin as John 'Pop' Baldwin
Russell Hopton as Sullivan

References

Bibliography
 Morgan, Michelle The Ice Cream Blonde: The Whirlwind Life and Mysterious Death of Screwball Comedienne Thelma Todd. Chicago Review Press, 2015.
 Scott, Ian. In Capra's Shadow: The Life and Career of Screenwriter Robert Riskin. University Press of Kentucky,  2014.

External links

 
 

1932 films
1932 drama films
1930s sports drama films
American black-and-white films
American sports drama films
Animated sports films
Columbia Pictures films
Films directed by Edward Buzzell
1930s English-language films
1930s American films
Boxing films